James Miller (born 29 January 1904) was a Scottish footballer who played for several clubs including Raith Rovers, East Fife, Dumbarton, Swansea Town, Millwall, Hibernian and Albion Rovers, in a career almost exactly spanning the 20 years between World War I and World War II. Initially his position was centre forward but he later moved to a more defensive role, often playing at left half.

References

1904 births
Year of death missing

Scottish footballers

Dumbarton F.C. players
Raith Rovers F.C. players
Maryhill F.C. players
Alloa Athletic F.C. players
Armadale F.C. players
East Fife F.C. players
Swansea City A.F.C. players
Millwall F.C. players
Hibernian F.C. players
Albion Rovers F.C. players
Scottish Junior Football Association players
Scottish Football League players
English Football League players
Association football forwards
Association football wing halves